Webdriver Torso is a YouTube automated performance testing account that became famous in 2014 for speculations about its (then unexplained) nature and jokes featured in some of its videos.

Created by Google on 7 March 2013, the channel began uploading videos on 23 September of the same year, consisting of simple slides accompanied by beeps. It was brought to public attention in 2014 when it became a source of speculation for viewers who discovered it and noted three atypical videos featuring jokes. It remained a popular mystery until YouTube humorously acknowledged that the channel exists as an internal testing utility. The channel stopped posting videos at its same rate after 624,774 videos as of 4 May 2017. The channel posted a few more videos in May, August, and October 2018, followed by uploads in July and October 2019. The channel once again posted a video on 22 November 2021. Another post was made on 3 May 2022.

Videos

From 30 September 2016 to 31 October 2019, the channel uploaded a total of 624,774 videos. The interval between one upload and another was usually between 1 and 15 minutes, but sometimes up to one hour. With the exception of three, all videos follow the set of standards described below. The channel stopped uploading on 4 May 2017, but resumed uploading on 18 May 2018 until another halt four days later. One of the last videos were uploaded on 16 November 2020, but was then quickly deleted, as of now, the latest video uploaded by Webdriver Torso was on 3 May 2022.

Most of the videos are 11 seconds long, although some are also around 1 minute, 5 minutes, or 25 minutes long. They are slideshows showing slides about 1 second long each. Each slide consists of a solid white background overlapped by two solid color opaque rectangles, one red and the other blue. Both rectangles have a random size, shape, and position on the slide. When the two overlap, the red rectangle always appears over the blue one, and on rare occasions, the red rectangle completely covers up the blue one. Each slide has a random computer-generated wave tone. In the corner of each video, it says "aqua.flv - slide (slide number with four digits)". Early videos were called "aqua", which was then changed to "tmp", an abbreviation for the word "template" or "temporary", followed by random characters.

Unusual uploads

The channel has three videos which do not follow the channel's standards, featuring instead internal references or jokes. One of them, titled "tmpRkRL85" (presumably standing for "Temporary Rick Roll 1985" or "Template Rickroll 1985"), plays normally until the red rectangle becomes a silhouette of Rick Astley dancing (referencing the Rickrolling phenomenon) in the second half of the video. The video "00014" is a piece of timelapse footage recorded in Paris that shows the Eiffel Tower being lit up at night. At the end of the video, the camera is put down, and the Webdriver Torso Facebook page is visible for a few frames. The last one, "0.455442373793", is only viewable in France, requires a payment of 1.99 euros to watch, and is only payable with a French credit card. It shows an episode of the American adult cartoon Aqua Teen Hunger Force dubbed in Spanish. While seemingly not an internal reference or joke, the May 3rd, 2022, upload, titled "generated 10min vid," has text in the bottom left corner that reads "kaustubhb.20220503-161459.640x360x10min.0600s - Slide (slide number with four digits)" as opposed to the usual "aqua.flv - slide (slide number with four digits)".

Speculation	
Prior to YouTube's confirmation of the channel as a test channel, there was some speculation about the identity and content of the videos. Hypotheses about the channel's purposes included spy messages, contact by extraterrestrial life-forms, construction plans and a Cicada 3301 recruitment program.

Unexplained references	
Despite Google having clarified the channel's purpose, this did not explain the seemingly humorous references contained in some of the videos. These include the Aqua Teen Hunger Force episode, the Rick Astley silhouette, and the Eiffel Tower footage. Additionally, Webdriver Torso at one time commented "Matei is highly intelligent". The "Matei" in question is unknown, but Basarab Matei, Matei Mancas, Matei Gruber, Matei Ciocarlie, and former Cinemassacre producer Mike Matei have all been suspected. The  "Matei" comment was apparently removed at some later time.

Soggetto Ventuno's investigation	
An Italian blogger named Soggetto Ventuno found out that Webdriver Torso belongs to a network of accounts called "ytuploadtestpartner_torso". Ventuno then discovered some other accounts with similar videos, many of which were pulled or made private after Ventuno's investigations were published. The network linked to a Facebook page and a Twitter page, which have now both been taken down. The Facebook page had mentioned Johannes Leitner, a Google Zürich employee. Leitner was friends with another employee, Matei Gruber. A "Matei" is mentioned on 00014 (see above). Ventuno then compared scenes from pulled videos with Google Zürich photos, and noticed matching things, indicating that the pulled videos were recorded at Google Zürich, and that the channel and all similar channels were run from Google Zürich.

Purpose of videos	
The videos are made to test YouTube video quality. After creation, the videos are uploaded to YouTube. The uploaded videos are then compared to the videos before they were uploaded, to see how much quality was lost.

YouTube's reply	
When YouTube was asked about Webdriver Torso, they replied:
 	
"We're never gonna give you uploading that's slow or loses video quality, and we're never gonna let you down by playing YouTube in poor video quality. That's why we're always running tests like Webdriver Torso."  This is a reference to Rick Astley's song "Never Gonna Give You Up".

Easter eggs	

	
When "Webdriver Torso" is searched into Google, the Google logo will look like a Webdriver Torso video. Another Easter egg is that in the Android L developer builds, the Android Version Easter Egg is a reference to Webdriver Torso videos. However, if a Google Doodle is running, it will sometimes not appear.

See also
 Test card
 Unfavorable Semicircle

References

External links

Timeworks' video on the subject

Google
YouTube channels
Test items
Internet memes
Internet mysteries
YouTube channels launched in 2013